CDw17 antigen is a lactosylceramide, a class of glycosphingolipids found in microdomains on the plasma layers of numerous cells.

The enzyme A4GALT acts upon it, aiding transfer of galactose to lactosylceramide to form globotriaosylceramide.

References

Glycolipids